Fawad Ahmed Hussain Chaudhry (born 7 April 1970) is a Pakistani  politician and a senior member of Pakistan Tehreek-e-Insaf, who was Federal Minister for Information and Broadcasting, in office since 14 April 2021 to 10 April 2022.

Previously, he held the office of Federal Minister for Science and Technology from 19 April 2019 to 16 April 2021. He had been a member of the National Assembly of Pakistan from August 2018 till January 2023. He is a member of Pakistan Tehreek-e-Insaf's core committee since 4 June 2019.

Previously, he has also served in the federal cabinet of Prime Minister Yousaf Raza Gillani and Prime Minister Raja Pervaiz Ashraf as Special Assistant for information and political affairs, and Political Affairs, respectively, between April 2012 and March 2013.

Personal life
He was born  in Dina, in Pakistan's Punjab province. He belongs to a politically active Muslim-Jat family of the Vains (also spelled Bains) clan, his uncle Chaudhry Altaf Hussain being appointed Governor of Punjab twice while another uncle Chaudhary Iftikhar Hussain has served as Chief Justice of Lahore High Court. 

He is lawyer by profession and has worked as a political analyst and an anchor for several media organizations.

Political career
He ran for the seat of the Provincial Assembly of the Punjab as an independent candidate from Constituency PP-25 (Jhelum-II) in 2002 Pakistani general election but was unsuccessful. As a backup candidate, He received only 161 votes and lost the seat to  Chaudhry Tasneem Nasir, a candidate of Pakistan Muslim League (Q) (PML-Q) who received 38,626 votes.

In January 2012, he resigned as media coordinator of All Pakistan Muslim League (APML). In March 2012, he quit APML and joined Pakistan Peoples Party (PPP). In April 2012, he was inducted into the federal cabinet of Prime Minister Yousaf Raza Gillani and was appointed as special assistant to Prime Minister for information and political affairs with the status of a minister of state where he continued to serve until June 2012 when the federal cabinet was dissolved following the disqualification of Prime Minister Yousaf Raza Gillani. In July 2012, Raja Pervaiz Ashraf was elected Prime Minister and Chaudhry was re-inducted into the federal cabinet. He was appointed as Special Assistant for Prime Minister on Political Affairs where he served until March 2013.

He ran for the seat of the National Assembly of Pakistan as a candidate of PML-Quaid from NA-63 (Jhelum-II) in 2013 Pakistani general election but was unsuccessful. He received 34,072 votes and lost the seat to Malik Iqbal Mehdi Khan. In the same election, he also ran for the seat of the Provincial Assembly of the Punjab as an independent candidate from Constituency PP-24 (Jhelum-I) but was unsuccessful. He received only 82 votes and lost the seat to Raja Muhammad Awais Khan.

In June 2016, he joined Pakistan Tehreek-e-Insaf (PTI).

He ran for the seat of the National Assembly as a candidate of PTI from Constituency Constituency NA-63 (Jhelum-II) in by-election held in August 2016 but was unsuccessful. He received 74,819 votes and lost the seat to Nawabzada Raja Matloob Mehdi.

In November 2016, he was appointed as the spokesperson of PTI.  In March 2018, he was given the additional charge of Secretary Information of PTI after the resignation of Mr. Shafqat Mahmood.

In June 2018, he was allocated PTI ticket to contest the 2018 Pakistani general election from Constituency NA-67 (Jhelum-II). An election tribunal rejected the nomination papers of Chaudhry after a petition was filed claiming Fawad had not paid agriculture tax. The Lahore High Court allowed Chaudhry to contest the election after he filed an appeal in high court against the election tribunal's decision.

He was elected to the National Assembly as a candidate of PTI from Constituency NA-67 (Jhelum-II) in 2018 general election. He received 93,102 votes and defeated Nawabzada Raja Matloob Mehdi, a candidate of Pakistan Muslim League (N) (PML-N). In the same election, he was also elected to the Provincial Assembly of the Punjab as a candidate of PTI from Constituency PP-27 (Jhelum-III). He received 67,003 votes and defeated Nasir Mehmood, a candidate of PML-N. Following his successful election, he expressed interest to become the Chief Ministers of Punjab in a TV talk show.

On 18 August 2018, Imran Khan formally announced his federal cabinet structure and Chaudhry was named as Minister for Information and Broadcasting. On 20 August 2018, he was appointed as Federal Minister for Information and Broadcasting in the federal cabinet of Prime Minister Imran Khan.

In April 2019, Prime Minister Imran Khan announced a major reshuffle of the federal cabinet and Chaudhry was removed as Federal Minister for Information and Broadcasting. He was subsequently appointed as Federal Minister for Science and Technology.

Journalistic career
He hosted Khabar Kay Pechay on Neo News. In March 2015 he took an interview of Syed Mustafa Kamal.

Controversies

Moon Sighting Controversy 
In May 2019, Chaudhry launched Pakistan's first official moon-sighting website and issued five-year lunar calendar based on scientific readings of the moon’s movement in a bid to end Pakistan's moon-sighting controversy, however his move was severely criticized by the religious clerics. He is criticized for preferring far left polemic over objective dialogue with legal experts in classical universities. During another controversy Fawad Chaudhry slapped Bol News anchor Sami Ibrahim.

Sedition Case 
On 24 January 2023, he was arrested in allegations of threatening senior members of Pakistan Election Commission and their families in order to desist from their duties according to Islamabad police. An FIR (No 69/23) was registered against the PTI leader under sections 153-A, 506, 505 and 124-A of PPC on the complaint of Secretary ECP Omar Hamid Khan, saying the accused used threatening language against the commission and its members. Speaking to the media and people, the accused, Fawad Chaudhry, threatened the ECP members and their families, the FIR stated.  Fawad Chaudhry was released from Adiala jail on 1 February 2023 after he was granted bail on the condition that he would not repeat any such words that incite violence against a constitutional institution. The ECP and prosecution opposed Fawad’s bail and requested the court to reject it.

References

Living people
Pakistani MNAs 2018–2023
Pakistan Tehreek-e-Insaf MNAs
Pakistani lawyers
Punjabi people
People from Jhelum District
Chaudhry family (Jhelum)
Federal ministers of Pakistan
Politicians from Jhelum
Information Ministers of Pakistan
1970 births